Methallorphan may refer to:

 Dextrallorphan
 Levallorphan

See also
 Methorphan

Morphinans